Corning is a village in Perry County, Ohio, United States. The population was 583 at the 2010 census.

History
Corning was platted in 1878. An early variant name was Ferrara.  A post office has been in operation at Corning since 1880.

Geography
Corning is located at  (39.604689, -82.088015), along Sunday Creek.

Demographics

2010 census
As of the census of 2010, there were 583 people, 226 households, and 152 families living in the village. The racial makeup of the village was 97.3% White, 0.5% African American, 0.3% Native American, and 1.9% from two or more races. Hispanic or Latino of any race were 0.3% of the population.

There were 226 households, of which 39.4% had children under the age of 18 living with them, 37.2% were married couples living together, 21.7% had a female householder with no husband present, 8.4% had a male householder with no wife present, and 32.7% were non-families. 25.7% of all households were made up of individuals, and 14.2% had someone living alone who was 65 years of age or older. The average household size was 2.58 and the average family size was 3.07.

The median age in the village was 30.9 years. 30% of residents were under the age of 18; 9.7% were between the ages of 18 and 24; 27.8% were from 25 to 44; 18.8% were from 45 to 64; and 13.7% were 65 years of age or older. The gender makeup of the village was 48.9% male and 51.1% female.

2000 census
As of the census of 2000, there were 593 people, 239 households, and 159 families living in the village. The population density was 1,360.1 people per square mile (520.4/km2). There were 269 housing units at an average density of 617.0 per square mile (236.0/km2). The racial makeup of the village was 97.13% White, 0.34% African American, 0.34% Native American, 0.17% Asian, and 2.02% from two or more races. Hispanic or Latino of any race were 0.17% of the population.

There were 239 households, out of which 29.7% had children under the age of 18 living with them, 49.8% were married couples living together, 13.8% had a female householder with no husband present, and 33.1% were non-families. 28.5% of all households were made up of individuals, and 18.0% had someone living alone who was 65 years of age or older. The average household size was 2.48 and the average family size was 3.03.

In the village, the population was spread out, with 25.8% under the age of 18, 8.6% from 18 to 24, 28.0% from 25 to 44, 20.4% from 45 to 64, and 17.2% who were 65 years of age or older. The median age was 38 years. For every 100 females there were 88.3 males. For every 100 females age 18 and over, there were 84.1 males.

The median income for a household in the village was $27,868, and the median income for a family was $31,875. Males had a median income of $31,875 versus $20,481 for females. The per capita income for the village was $13,615. About 12.5% of families and 15.3% of the population were below the poverty line, including 24.0% of those under age 18 and 8.4% of those age 65 or over.

Education
Southern Local School District operates one elementary school and Miller High School.

Corning has a public library, a branch of the Perry County District Library.

References

External links

Villages in Perry County, Ohio
Villages in Ohio
1878 establishments in Ohio
Populated places established in 1878